Thomas Gangemi, Sr. (July 29, 1903 – December 1, 1976) was the 35th mayor of Jersey City, New Jersey. Elected in 1961, the Italian-born Gangemi was forced to resign from office less than two years later when it was discovered that he had never become a United States citizen. Following his resignation, Jersey City was without a mayor for 47 days while the city council failed to reach a consensus on a successor.

Biography
Gangemi became a naturalized citizen on September 2, 1964. He filed petitions to run for mayor again in 1965, but was refused by the City Clerk and New Jersey Superior Court before being allowed on the ballot (see Gangemi v. Rosengard 207 A.2d 665 (N.J. 1965)). While history focuses on Gangemi's untimely resignation, he was a visionary who reimagined the Jersey City waterfront and downtown as locales of tremendous economic growth.

Gangemi was married to Carrie Gangemi (née Romano) and had three children, Thomas Jr., Anthony, and Marie. The eldest, Thomas Jr. also ran for mayor of Jersey City in 1973, but lost to incumbent Paul T. Jordan.

References

Mayors of Jersey City, New Jersey
1903 births
1976 deaths
New Jersey Democrats
Italian emigrants to the United States
20th-century American politicians
American people of Italian descent